Frigyes Kubinyi (March 23, 1909 – August 17, 1948) was a Hungarian boxer who competed in the 1936 Summer Olympics.

In 1936 he was eliminated in the second round of the bantamweight class after losing his fight to the upcoming gold medalist Ulderico Sergo.

External links

1909 births
1948 deaths
Bantamweight boxers
Olympic boxers of Hungary
Boxers at the 1936 Summer Olympics
Hungarian male boxers